Salam Devendran (born c. 1929) was a Malaysian field hockey player. He competed in the men's tournament at the 1956 Summer Olympics.

References

External links
 

Year of birth uncertain
Possibly living people
Malaysian male field hockey players
Olympic field hockey players of Malaya
Field hockey players at the 1956 Summer Olympics
Place of birth missing (living people)
Malaysian sportspeople of Indian descent
Malaysian people of Tamil descent